1535 Päijänne, provisional designation , is an asteroid from the outer region of the asteroid belt, approximately 25 kilometers in diameter. It was discovered on 9 September 1939, by Finnish astronomer Yrjö Väisälä at the Turku Observatory in Southwest Finland. It was later named for Lake Päijänne.

Orbit 

Päijänne orbits the Sun in the outer main-belt at a distance of 2.6–3.8 AU once every 5 years and 8 months (2,057 days). Its orbit has an eccentricity of 0.19 and an inclination of 6° with respect to the ecliptic.

Physical characteristics 

Päijänne is classified as both S-type and transitional CX-type asteroid.

Lightcurves 

In September 2006, a rotational lightcurve of Päijänne was obtained from photometric observations taken by French amateur astronomer Laurent Bernasconi. The lightcurve analysis gave a well-defined rotation period of 8.8448 hours with a change in brightness of 0.50 magnitude.

Diameter and albedo 

According to the surveys carried out by the Infrared Astronomical Satellite IRAS, the Japanese Akari satellite, and NASA's Wide-field Infrared Survey Explorer with its subsequent NEOWISE mission, Päijänne measures between 23.836 and 26.72 kilometers in diameter, and its surface has an albedo between 0.1299 and 0.164. The Collaborative Asteroid Lightcurve Link derives an albedo of 0.0638 and a diameter of 26.36 kilometers with an absolute magnitude of 11.5.

Naming 

This minor planet was named for Finland's second largest lake, Päijänne, located in south-central Finland, and more than a thousand square kilometers in size. The official  was published by the Minor Planet Center on 20 February 1976.

References

External links 
 Asteroid Lightcurve Database (LCDB), query form (info )
 Dictionary of Minor Planet Names, Google books
 Asteroids and comets rotation curves, CdR – Observatoire de Genève, Raoul Behrend
 Discovery Circumstances: Numbered Minor Planets (1)-(5000) – Minor Planet Center
 
 

 

001535
Discoveries by Yrjö Väisälä
Named minor planets
19390909